Charleston School District  is a school district in Franklin County, Arkansas.

References

External links
 

School districts in Arkansas